Three Creeks (also known as Three Creeks Village) is a village in Warren County, Missouri, United States. Three Creeks was incorporated on November 4, 2008 and had an estimated population of 4 in 2009. As of the 2010 census, its population had risen to 6.

Geography

Demographics

2010 census
As of the census of 2010, there were 6 people, 3 households, and 3 families residing in the village. The racial makeup of the village was 100.0% White.

There were 3 households, of which 100.0% were married couples living together. 0.0% of all households were made up of individuals. The average household size was 2.00 and the average family size was 2.00.

The median age in the village was 76.5 years. 0.0% of residents were under the age of 18; 0.0% were between the ages of 18 and 24; 33.3% were from 25 to 44; 0.0% were from 45 to 64; and 66.7% were 65 years of age or older. The gender makeup of the village was 50.0% male and 50.0% female.

References

Villages in Warren County, Missouri
Villages in Missouri